Papareschi is an Italian surname, and may refer to:

 House of Papareschi (also De Papa or Paparoni) a noble family of medieval Rome. To it belong:
 Gregorio Papareschi (cardinal) (12th century), cardinal-nephew of Pope Innocent II
 Gregorio Papareschi (died 1143), Italian pope (Innocent II)
 Pietro Papareschi (12th century), cardinal-nephew of Pope Innocent II
 Romano Bonaventura (died 1243), also listed as Romano Papareschi

Surnames
House of Papareschi